This is a list of seasons completed by the Louisville Cardinals men's college basketball team.

Seasons

  Adjusted record is 0–10 (30 wins vacated) and adjusted conference record is 0–8 (10 wins vacated)
  Adjusted record is 0–5 (35 wins vacated) and adjusted conference record is 0–4 (14 wins vacated)
  Louisville forfeited 123 wins during 2011–2014, its NCAA tournament appearances, and its 2013 National Championship title.
  Adjusted record is 0–6 (31 wins vacated) and adjusted conference record is 0–3 (15 wins vacated)
  Adjusted record is 0–9 (27 wins vacated) and adjusted conference record is 0–6 (12 wins vacated)
  Self–imposed post–season ban due to pending NCAA investigation
  Adjusted record is 1,772–962 as of the end of the 2022 season.
  Mack was suspended and later fired during the 2021–22 season.  Mack's record was 6–8 (5–5 ACC), while Peagues was 7–11, (1–9 ACC).

References

 
Louisville Cardinals
Louisville Cardinals men's basketball seasons